The Oriental Shorthair is a breed of domestic cat that is developed from and closely related to the Siamese cat. It maintains the modern Siamese head and body type but appears in a wide range of coat colors and patterns. Like the Siamese, Orientals have almond-shaped eyes, a triangular head shape, large ears, and an elongated, slender, and muscular body. Their personalities are also very similar. Orientals are social, intelligent, and many are rather vocal. They often remain playful into adulthood, with many enjoying playing fetch. Despite their slender appearance, they are athletic and can leap into high places. They prefer to live in pairs or groups and also seek human interaction. Unlike the breed's blue-eyed forebear, Orientals are usually green-eyed. The Oriental Longhair differs only with respect to coat length.

While the breed's genetic roots are ultimately in Thailand, it was formally developed in the US by a number of New York area cat breeders, led by Vicky and Peter Markstein (PetMark cattery), who in 1971-72 were intrigued by lynx patterned and solid colored cats of a Siamese body type at Angela Sayers' Solitaire Cattery and at Patricia White's. These were based on solid-colored cats with the body of a Siamese, bred by Baroness von Ullmann over the 1950s.  An "Oriental Shorthairs International" was formed in 1973, and Peter Markstein presented the breed to the 1976 Annual Cat Fanciers Association, at the same time as the Havana Brown was presented by Joe Bittaker. In 1977 the Oriental Shorthair was accepted by the Cat Fanciers' Association for championship competition. Since 1997, it has also received recognition from the GCCF and various other cat breeding organizations. The breed is among the most popular among CFA members.cats

Description

Breed 

The Oriental Shorthair is a member of the Siamese family of breeds, and can be found in various solid colors, and patterns such as smoke, shaded, parti-color/tortoiseshell, tabby and bicolor (any of the above, with white). Not all variants are acceptable to all organizations that recognize the breed.

Characteristics 

Conforming Oriental Shorthairs, like any of the Siamese type, have almond-shaped eyes and a wedge-shaped head with large ears. Their bodies are typically "sleek" but muscular.

The long-haired version of the breed, the Oriental Longhair (recognized since 1995 by CFA), simply carries a pair of the recessive long hair genes.

Personality 
Oriental Shorthair cats have high locomotion levels and are natural conversationalists. The adult Oriental Shorthair cats are considered to be active, curious and interested about surroundings by breeders and veterinarians.

Size 
The Oriental Shorthair is a medium size cat.

Health 
Due to the close relationship with the Siamese, it could have similar health problems as the Siamese:

 Amyloidosis
 Asthma/bronchial disease
 Congenital heart defects
 Crossed eyes
 Gastrointestinal conditions
 Hyperesthesia syndrome
 Lymphoma
 Nystagmus
 Progressive retinal atrophy

Oriental cats show low seroprevalence of Feline Coronavirus Antibodies.

Oriental Shorthair cats have a lower incidence of being overweight when neutered.

History and recognition

According to the CFA, "Orientals represent a diverse group of cats that have their foundation in the Siamese breed." The Siamese, in both pointed and solid colors, was imported to the UK from Siam (today, Thailand) in the later half of the 1800s, and from there spread widely, becoming one of the most popular breeds. The gene that causes the color to be restricted to the points is a recessive gene; therefore, the general population of the cats of Siam were largely self-colored (solid). When the cats from Siam were bred, the pointed cats were eventually registered as Siamese, while the others were referred to as "non-blue eyed Siamese" or "foreign shorthair". Other breeds that were developed from the landrace cats of Thailand include the Havana Brown (which some breed registries classify as simply an Oriental Shorthair variant) and the Korat.

The Oriental Shorthair was accepted as an actual breed for championship competition in the US-headquartered CFA in 1977. In 1985, the CFA recognized the bicolor variant. Two decades later, the breed was finally recognized by the UK-based Governing Council of the Cat Fancy (GCCF) in 1997, but with some differences from CFA on coat conformation. GCCF publishes separate breed registration policies for a number of specific-coat Oriental Shorthair variants today.  The Germany-based World Cat Federation (WCF) recognizes the breed, but with color requirements that are comparatively unrestrictive in some way, but notably opposed to white ("All colours and patterns without white and without points are recognized.")

In the Cat Fanciers' Association (CFA), some of the point-colored offspring from Oriental Shorthair parents are considered "any other variety" (AOV), but depending on the pedigree, some may compete as Colorpoints. In The International Cat Association (TICA) and many other cat fancier and breeder associations, these cats are considered to be, and compete as, Siamese, when recognized at all.

Patterns 

In total, over 300 coat color and pattern combinations are possible under CFA conformation rules.  The basic types include:

 Solid: The coat color is uniform across the entire cat. Each hair shaft should be the same color from root to tip, and be free of banding and tipping. CFA-acceptable colors for this breed are red, cream, ebony, blue, lavender, cinnamon, fawn and white. The corresponding GCCF colors are (respectively) red, cream, brown, blue, lilac, chocolate and apricot (white is not permitted as the base color in GCCF, and WCF does not permit white at all).
 Shaded pattern: Will have a white undercoat with only the tips being colored CFA and GCCF recognize this. Other breed registries call this the chinchilla pattern.
 Smoke pattern: The hair shaft will have a narrow band of white at the base which can only be seen when the hair is parted. This white undercoat to any of the above solid colors (except white, of course) is provided by an interaction of two different genes. CFA and GCCF recognize this.
 Parti-color: Has patches of red and/or cream, which may be well-defined blotches of color, or marbled. This color pattern is referred to as tortoiseshell (or "tortie" for short) in non-pedigreed cats by CFA, and this alternative term is used by GCCF and organizations for pedigreed cats as well.
 Tabby coat pattern: Recognized by GCCF and CFA.  Each hair shaft should have a band of color around the middle of the hair shaft. GCCF recognizes four variants of tabby: classic, mackerel, spotted and ticked.
Bicolor pattern: Recognized by GCCF and CFA. The bicolor pattern is created by the addition of a white spotting gene to any of the other accepted colors/patterns. The cat will have white on its belly, on the legs/paws, and in an inverted "V" on the face. WCF does not permit this variant, as it is opposed to white in this breed.

In popular culture 
In scientific illustrator Jey Parks' 2017 book Star Trek Cats, Star Treks Spock is depicted as an Oriental Shorthair.

In Joann Sfar's comic The Rabbi's Cat, the eponymous cat has the physical features of an Oriental Shorthair.

See also 

 Foreign White
 Peterbald

References

External links 
 

Cat breeds
Cat breeds originating in the United States